A Serata is one of a series of events organised by the futurists. These events combined artistic and nationalist political agendas with the intention of implementing change.

The first serata
The first serata was held at Politeama Rossetti, Trieste, in 1910. Marinetti chose Triste because it was part of the Austro-Hungarian Empire. Marinetti had already demonstrated his support for Guglielmo Oberdan, and had demonstrated the importance of Trieste for his irredentist campaign by declaring it  "Our Beautiful Powder-Maga-zin".

References

Futurism